Ngau Shi Wu  is a village in the North District of Hong Kong.

Administration
Ngau Shi Wu is a recognized village under the New Territories Small House Policy.

History
Ngau Shi Wu is one of the seven Hakka villages of the Hing Chun Yeuk, which comprises Kop Tong, Lai Chi Wo, Mui Tsz Lam, Ngau Shi Wu, Sam A Village, Siu Tan, and So Lo Pun.

Features
The Sai Lau Kong Fish Culture Zone, one of the 26 designated marine fish culture zones in Hong Kong, is located in Ngau Shi Wu Wan, a bay northeast of Ngau Shi Wu.

References

External links
 Delineation of area of existing village Ngau Shi Wu (Sha Tau Kok) for election of resident representative (2019 to 2022)

Villages in North District, Hong Kong